Secondary and Higher Education Division is a Bangladesh government division under the Ministry of Education responsible for secondary and higher education in Bangladesh. It is the highest policy making body concerning Secondary and Tertiary education in Bangladesh. It is responsible for overseeing 25227 High schools and 37 public universities and 92 private universities. Md. Sohorab Hossain is the Secretary and Head of the Division.

History
On 30 November 2016, the Government of Bangladesh divided the Education Ministry into two divisions, Secondary and Higher Education Division and Technical and Madrasah Education Division.

References

2016 establishments in Bangladesh
Organisations based in Dhaka
Government agencies of Bangladesh
Government departments of Bangladesh